I'm Still in Love with You may refer to:

Albums
 I'm Still in Love with You (Al Green album), or its title song (see below)
 I'm Still in Love with You (Roy Orbison album)

Songs
 "I'm Still in Love with You" (Al Green song)
 "I'm Still in Love with You" (New Edition song)
 "I'm Still in Love with You Boy", a song by Marcia Aitken, cover of Alton Ellis' song
 "I'm Still in Love with You" (Sean Paul song), another interpolation of the Alton Ellis song
 "I'm Still in Love with You", a song by Steve Earle from The Mountain

See also
 Still in Love with You (disambiguation)